3-Mercapto-1-propanesulfonic acid is a chemical compound often used as a brightener in copper electroplating.

References

Sulfonic acids
Thiols